"Mielihyvää" is a single by Finnish reggae artist Jukka Poika, from his third studio album Kylmästä lämpimään. It was released on 19 April 2010 as a digital download in Finland. The song peaked at number 10 on the Finnish Singles Chart.

Track listing

Chart performance

Release history

References

2010 singles
Jukka Poika songs
2010 songs